Pabhare, is a village in Guhagar taluka, Ratnagiri district, Maharashtra state, India. it is surrounded by the river banks of Kasari and Kapsi on all three sides. It is 24 km from Guhagar and 35 km from Chiplun. The postal head office of the village is located at Rampur.
Goddess Chandika is the local deity of the village. The major occupation of the village is farming and cashew nut crop cultivation.

History 
Pabhare being a rural village did not have any facilities until independence. It was difficult for people to meet their basic needs and hence the people in the village took an initiative to bring the village on the path of progress and with utmost co-operation established the first school in 1949. So also the residents of the village who then migrated to Mumbai in order to earn a living here also provided a helping hand in the overall development of the village. In 1971, the Pabhare Gramastha Mandal, Mumbai was established which provided all the necessary funds for the overall growth and progress of the village.

Demographics 
As of the 2011 census Pabhare had a population of 406, 170 males and 236 females, giving a sex ratio of 1388, significantly higher than the state average of 929. 42 residents were aged 0–6 comprising 10.34% of the population, with a sex ratio of 750, significantly lower than the state average of 894. Pabhare had a literacy rate of 60.99% (males 73.97%, females 52.29%) compared to a state average of 82.34%.

Culture 
The people of the village worship their local deity or specifically known as the 'Kuldaiwat'-Goddess Chandika. A classically architectured temple of the goddess is located in the vicinity where the local people offer their regular prayers. A big feast of the goddess is observed during the festival of Holi where the palanquin of the goddess pays its visit to every local house. A classic drama showcasing the ten incarnation of lord Vishu finds a major attraction (locally known as the 'Naman'). A local dance form widely famous in the Konkan region known as the 'Bala Dance' is also seen during the auspicious festival of Ganesh Chaturthi.
Farming is the basic occupation of the people in the village. Rice and Nachni are the major crops cultivated here. Mango, Cashewnut and Jackfruit are the major fruits grown.

Village structure 
The village is divided majorly into 9 local settlements each known as 'Wadi', each with a varied population. The 8 settlements are named as Madliwadi, Gavtanwadi, Brahmanwadi, Tepwadi, Varchiwadi, Salkachiwadi, Ghonaskande, Dhangarwadi and Durgwadi.

Language 
Marathi which is the state language is observed to be the most widely spoken language amongst the people in the village.

Transport 
The village is too rural to be connected easily to the city area of Guhaghar or Chiplun and hence one can reach this village via the bus service provided by MSTRC. These bus services are available from the city of Mumbai to Pabhare or one can even take a bus from Margatamhane (15 km) which is the neighbouring village and the nearest city area to Pabhare. Sharing autorickshaws, local vehicles are used as daily transportation facility from the village to the city area.
The nearest railway station accessible is Chiplun which is 35 km from the village.

References

External links
http://villagemap.in/maharashtra/ratnagiri/guhagar/4022200.html
https://villageinfo.in/maharashtra/ratnagiri/guhagar/pabhare-kh.html
http://www.mapsofindia.com/villages/maharashtra/ratnagiri/guhagar/pabhare.html
http://www.loksatta.com/vastu-lekh-news/houses-close-to-nature-in-pabhare-village-of-guhagar-taluka-1279825/

Cities and towns in Ratnagiri district